This is a list of notable online grocers. Online grocers are grocery stores that allow private individuals and businesses to purchase groceries and grocery products online. The companies then deliver the orders to consumers.

Online grocers

Asia 
 Giant Hypermarket Online – in Malaysia, Singapore, Brunei, Indonesia, Cambodia and formerly Vietnam
 Honestbee – founded in 2012 by Joel sng (online supermarket in Hong Kong, Indonesia, Japan, Malaysia, Philippines, Singapore, Taiwan and Thailand)

China

 Yihaodian – a Chinese online grocery business founded by Gang Yu and Junling Liu in July 2008

India

 Amazon Fresh
 BigBasket
 Blinkit
 DMart
 Dunzo
 Flipkart Grocery Store 
 JioMart
 Nature's Basket
 Spencer's Retail
 Swiggy

Singapore
 Cold Storage – established 1903
 NTUC FairPrice

Australia 

 Coles Online – an online retail website operated by Coles Supermarkets, one of Australia's largest companies
 Harris Farm Markets Online Home Delivery
 Woolworths Supermarket Online

Europe

Austria
 Flink

France
 Flink

Germany
 Bringmeister
 Flink
 Getir
 Gorillas
 REWE

Ireland

Italy
 Esselunga

Netherlands
 Flink

Switzerland
 Migros Online (formerly LeShop.ch) – a Swiss online supermarket and one of Europe’s largest online grocery stores

UK
 Asda
 Co-op Food
 Farmdrop (defunct) – an online food delivery company that distributes foods to consumers that is sourced from local farmers and fishermen
 Getir
 Gorillas
 Gousto
 Iceland
 Marks & Spencer – via a partnership with Ocado
 Morrisons – systems and delivery outsourced to Ocado
 Ocado
 Riverford
 Sainsbury's Online
 Tesco.com
 Waitrose

Latin America
 Rappi – operates in Argentina, Brazil, Chile, Colombia, Mexico, Peru and Uruguay

North America

Canada
 Grocery Gateway – acquired by Longo's in 2004
 Save-On-Foods
 Sustainable Produce Urban Delivery – an online grocery service operating along the west coast of North America that predominantly focuses in organic groceries
 Thrifty Foods

US

Multi-regional 

 Amazon Prime Pantry – a service of Amazon.com available only to Amazon Prime members
 AmazonFresh (membership-based)
 Blue Apron
 Crowd Cow
 Google Shopping, previously Google Express (personal shopper service)
 Gopuff
 Home Chef – a Chicago, Illinois-based weekly meal kit company that delivers pre-portioned ingredients and recipes to subscribers
 Instacart (personal shopper service)
 My Cloud Grocer – a grocery eCommerce software platform for the supermarket chains
 Peapod (East Coast)
 Safeway Inc.
 Shipt (membership-based personal shopper service)
 Walmart
 Whole Foods
 Winder Farms (West Coast)

Regional 
 FreshDirect (New York/New Jersey/Connecticut/Pennsylvania/Delaware/Washington D.C)
 Giant Eagle (PA/OH)
 Hy-Vee's Aisles Online (Iowa, Illinois, Kansas, Minnesota, Missouri, Nebraska, South Dakota, and Wisconsin)
 Kroger (CO/WY/TX)
 OurHarvest (NYC via Uber)
 Pink Dot (Los Angeles)
 Vons (Southern California)

Specialty 
 Jet (dry goods only)

Defunct 

 HomeGrocer (defunct, one of the first online supermarket businesses)
 Kozmo.com (defunct but possibly re-launching)
 Webvan (defunct)

Multinational
 Amazon Prime Now

Middle East

UAE
 Noon
 talabat
 InstaShop
 Spinneys
 Waitrose
 Carrefour

Saudi Arabia
Noon

Qatar

Egypt 
Noon

Israel 
 Shufersal Online

See also

 E-commerce
 List of grocers
 Online food ordering

References

External links 

Retailing-related lists